The 2012 Butler Bulldogs football team represented Butler University in the 2012 NCAA Division I FCS football season. They were led by seventh-year head coach Jeff Voris and played their home games at the Butler Bowl. They are a member of the Pioneer Football League. They finished the season 8–3, 7–1 in Pioneer League play to become Pioneer League champions.

Schedule

Source: Schedule

References

Butler
Butler Bulldogs football seasons
Pioneer Football League champion seasons
Butler Bulldogs football